This is a list of current airlines from Algeria.

See also
 List of airlines
 List of defunct airlines of Algeria

References

Algeria

Airlines
Airlines
Algeria